Jonathan Binns Were (25 April 1809 – 6 September 1885)  C.M.G., J.P. (Victoria) was an Australian politician, member of the Victorian Legislative Assembly and a stockbroker — the eponym of JBWere.

Were was the third son of Nicholas Were, of Landcox, Somerset, by his wife Frances (née Binns) and was born at Wellington, in that county. The Weres were a junior branch of a landowning family of Devon and Somerset, said to derive from the Giffard family of Brightley, Chittlehampton; despite appearing in records dating back to the 1400s, and their arms as having been used since at least the early 1600s, in his Port Phillip Gentlemen and good society in Melbourne before the gold rushes (1980), Paul De Serville observed that "after appearing in Burke’s Commoners, the family was dropped from... subsequent editions. It is hard to escape the conclusion that they were an ascendant family who gained the capricious attention of the Burkes and then lost it."

In England, Were was in business as a merchant. He married Sophia Mullet Dunsford in 1833, by whom he would have twelve children.
He travelled from Plymouth aboard the William Metcalfe from July to November 1839, when he arrived at Port Phillip, now Victoria (Australia), with his wife, infant son Jonathan Henry (later a partner in J. B. Were & Co.), and four-year-old daughter Sophia Louisa. Were had laid meticulous plans for the family's life in Australia: "While most newcomers were seeking in vain for tradesmen to build them houses he unpacked his imported house and erected it on a site on the south-western corner of Collins and Spring Streets... it was on the outskirts of the settlement. The home was named 'Harmony Lodge'". He established himself as a merchant in Melbourne, soon expanding into other business resulting from the 'gold era'- "an advertisement appeared in the Melbourne papers announcing that J. B. Were & Co. were cash purchasers of gold dust, wool and tallow, or would make liberal cash advances on such commodities consigned to their agents, Messrs Frederick Huth & Co., London."

In 1852 Were unsuccessfully contested South Bourke for a seat in the original unicameral Victorian Legislative Council, Henry Miller defeating him. Four years later Were was returned to the Victorian Legislative Assembly for Brighton, in opposition to John Dennistoun Wood. He resigned, however, in March 1857, and never re-entered political life.

Were was a stock- and share-broker from 1860, operating as J. B. Were & Son from 1861.

Were, who was consul in Melbourne for several foreign nations, was the first chairman of the Melbourne Chamber of Commerce in 1841, and, was re-elected in 1852. In 1881 he was created C.M.G. in recognition of his services in connection with the Melbourne International Exhibition (1880). Were was knighted by the kings of Sweden and Denmark.

Were died on 6 September 1885, in Victoria, Australia. Having married again in 1882, he was survived by his second wife, Elizabeth (née McArthur).

References

1809 births
1885 deaths
Members of the Victorian Legislative Assembly
Companions of the Order of St Michael and St George
19th-century Australian politicians
Settlers of Melbourne
English emigrants to colonial Australia
People from Wellington, Somerset
Politicians from Melbourne
19th-century English businesspeople
Businesspeople from Melbourne
19th-century Australian businesspeople